Boulaouane is a small town and rural commune in El Jadida Province of the Casablanca-Settat region of Morocco. The town is near the Oum Er-Rbia River and the fortress (Boulanouane Kasbah) overlooks that river. At the time of the 2004 census, the commune had a total population of 14,404 people living in 2319 households.

History

The fortress or Kasbah that overlooks an important bend in the river was built by Moulay Ismail in 1710. The  towers command a view of the surrounding area.

References

Populated places in El Jadida Province
Rural communes of Casablanca-Settat